William Henry Davies may refer to:

W. H. Davies (1871–1940), Welsh poet and writer
William Henry Davies (entrepreneur) (1831–1921), English-born Canadian founder of the William Davies Company

See also
William Davies (disambiguation)